Levellers is the third full-length release by Brighton-based folk punk band the Levellers. The record charted at number two in the British album charts. It contains the singles "Belaruse," "This Garden," and "Julie."

Critical reception
Trouser Press called Levellers "a harder-rocking, less distinctive and personable album," writing that "the disastrous 'This Garden' slaps didgeridoo onto dance rhythms and an attempted rap vocal."

Track listing
 All band members are given writing credits on all the tracks apart from "Dirty Davey," which is credited to Nick Burbridge (of McDermott's Two Hours), and "The Flowers of the Forest/The Crags of Stirling," which are traditional arrangements. The re-release of the album in 2007 contains a cover of "Subvert" by Zounds and a cover of The Clash's "English Civil War."

"Warning" – 5:00
"100 Years of Solitude" – 3:58
"The Likes of You and I" – 4:50
"Is This Art?" – 3:12
"Dirty Davey" – 4:29
"This Garden" - 5:28
"Broken Circles" – 3:15
"Julie" (plus "The Flowers of the Forest"/"The Crags of Stirling" instrumentals) – 6:12
"The Player" – 4:00
"Belaruse" – 3:00
(a short secret track follows "Belaruse")

The 2007 re-issue of the album also contained the bonus tracks:
"The Lowlands of Holland"
"English Civil War"
"Subvert"
"Belaruse Return"

Personnel

Musicians
 Mark Chadwick - guitars, vocals
 Charlie Heather - drums/percussion
 Jeremy Cunningham - bass guitar, artwork
 Simon Friend - guitars, vocals, mandolin
 Jonathan Sevink - fiddle
 Steve Boakes - didgeridoo
 Jem Finer - hurdy-gurdy
 Callum Williams - bagpipes
 The Kick Horns - brass instruments
 Richard Evans - tin whistle
 Jacinda Jones - backing vocals

Technical staff
 Markus Dravs - production and sound engineering
 Ben Findlay - additional engineering

Charts

Weekly charts

Year-end charts

References

1993 albums
Levellers
Albums produced by Markus Dravs
China Records albums